Alan Placek is a former American soccer player who played in the USISL Premier League, National Professional Soccer League, and the Canadian Professional Soccer League.

Playing career 
Placek began his career in 1996 with the Mid-Michigan Bucks in the USISL Premier League. During his first tenure with the Bucks he helped the club win their division title in 1997. In 1998, he signed with the Detroit Rockers of the National Professional Soccer League, where he appeared in 32 matches. In 1999, he returned to Michigan helping the club to win two division titles. In 2004, Placek signed with the newly formed Windsor Border Stars of the Canadian Professional Soccer League. In his debut season he helped the club reach the final of the Open Canada Cup, where Windsor faced Ottawa St. Anthony Italia and won the tournament by defeating Ottawa 4-2 in penalties. During the regular season he helped Windsor finish third in the Western Conference, and clinch a postseason berth. In the quarterfinals the team faced Toronto Croatia, but suffered a 5-0 defeat.

References 

Living people
American soccer players
Flint City Bucks players
Detroit Rockers players
Windsor City FC players
USL League Two players
National Professional Soccer League (1984–2001) players
Canadian Soccer League (1998–present) players
Association football goalkeepers
Year of birth missing (living people)